Sky Lovers is a 2002 Chinese romance television series produced by Nei Mongol Television in conjunction with Beijing Zhennan Culture & Arts (北京震南文化艺术). It includes 6 unrelated love stories, each 5 episodes long.

The opening theme song is "Xiangshui" (香水; "Perfume") performed by Nicholas Tse.

Segments
Every segment is named after a pop song, which is then used as the end theme song of that segment.

2002 Chinese television series debuts
2002 Chinese television series endings
Chinese romance television series
2000s anthology television series
Mandarin-language television shows